This page lists the World Best Year Performances in the year 1987 in the Men's hammer throw. One of the main events during this season were the 1987 World Athletics Championships in Rome, Italy, where the final of the men's competition was held on Tuesday September 1, 1987. (The women did not compete in the hammer throw until the early 1990s.)

Records

1987 World Year Ranking

References
digilander.libero
apulanta
hammerthrow.wz

1987
Hammer Throw Year Ranking, 1987